Manifest may refer to:

Computing
 Manifest file, a metadata file that enumerates files in a program or package
 Manifest (CLI), a metadata text file for CLI assemblies

Events
 Manifest (convention), a defunct anime festival in Melbourne, Australia
 Manifest (urban arts festival), put on by Columbia College Chicago, in Illinois, US

Film and television
 Manifest: The Chryzinium Era, a 2017 American short film
 Manifest (TV series), a 2018 American drama series
 "Manifest" (Luke Cage), a television episode

Music

Albums
 Manifest (Amaranthe album), 2020
 Manifest (Impaled Nazarene album), 2007
 Manifest (Linda Sundblad album), 2010
 Manifest!, by Friends, 2012
 Manifest, by Chessie, 2008

Songs
 "Manifest", by Andrew Bird from My Finest Work Yet
 "Manifest", by the Fugees from The Score
 "Manifest", by Gang Starr from No More Mr. Nice Guy
 "Manifest", by Sepultura from  Chaos A.D.
 "Manifest", by Starset from Divisions

Other uses
 Manifest (transportation), a document listing the cargo, passengers, and crew of a vehicle
 Manifest, Louisiana, US, an unincorporated area
 Democracy Manifest, Queensland police incident

See also
 Manafest, Canadian musician
 Manifesta, a European contemporary arts biennale
 Manifestation (disambiguation)
 Manifesto (disambiguation)